The 2009 Segunda División season was the 64th edition of the second tier of Federación Peruana de Futbol. There were 12 teams in play played. The champion, Sport Boys, was promoted to the 2010 Peruvian First Division. The last places, Real Academia and Deportivo Municipal, were relegated to Copa Perú. The tournament was played on a home-and-away round-robin basis.

Teams

Table

Standings

Results

References

External links
 RSSSF

Peruvian Segunda División seasons
2